The Amundsen Sea, an arm of the Southern Ocean off Marie Byrd Land in western Antarctica, lies between Cape Flying Fish (the northwestern tip of Thurston Island) to the east and Cape Dart on Siple Island to the west. Cape Flying Fish marks the boundary between the Amundsen Sea and the Bellingshausen Sea. West of Cape Dart there is no named marginal sea of the Southern Ocean between the Amundsen and Ross Seas. The Norwegian expedition of 1928–1929 under Captain Nils Larsen named the body of water for the Norwegian polar explorer Roald Amundsen while exploring this area in February 1929.

The sea is mostly ice-covered, and the Thwaites Ice Tongue protrudes into it.

Embayment 

In March 2007, scientists studying the ASE through satellite and airborne surveys announced a significant thinning of the ASE, due to shifts in wind patterns that allow warmer waters to flow beneath the ice sheet.

Some scientists have proposed that this region may be a "weak underbelly" of the West Antarctic Ice Sheet. The Pine Island and Thwaites Glaciers, which both flow into the Amundsen Sea, are two of Antarctica's largest five. Scientist have suggested that the loss of these glaciers would destabilise the entire West Antarctic ice sheet and possibly sections of the East Antarctic Ice Sheet.

A study in October 2004 suggested that because the ice in the Amundsen Sea had been melting rapidly and riven with cracks, the offshore ice shelf was set to collapse "within five years".

Measurements made by the British Antarctic Survey in 2005 showed that the ice discharge rate into the Amundsen Sea embayment was about 250 km3 per year. Assuming a steady rate of discharge, this alone is sufficient to raise global sea levels by 0.2 mm per year.

A subglacial volcano has also been detected in the area, just north of the Pine Island Glacier near the Hudson Mountains. It last erupted approximately 2,200 years ago, indicated by widespread ash deposits within the ice, in what was the largest known eruption in Antarctica within the past 10 millennia. Volcanic activity in the region may be contributing to the observed increase of glacial flow, although currently the most popular theory amongst the scientists studying this area is that the flow has increased due to warming ocean water. This water has warmed due to an upwelling of deep ocean water which is due to variations in pressure systems, which could have been affected by global warming.

In January 2010, a modelling study suggested that the "tipping point" for Pine Island Glacier may have been passed in 1996, with a retreat of  possible by 2100, producing a corresponding  of sea level rise, although it was suggested that these estimates for timespan were conservative. However, the modelling study also states that "Given the complex, three-dimensional nature of the real Pine Island glacier ... it should be clear that the [...] model is a very crude representation of reality."

Pine Island Bay 

It was delineated from aerial photographs taken by United States Navy (USN) Operation HIGHJUMP in December 1946, and named by the Advisory Committee on Antarctic Names for the USS Pine Island, seaplane tender and flagship of the eastern task group of USN Operation HIGHJUMP which explored this area.

Russell Bay 

Russell Bay is a rather open bay in southwestern Amundsen Sea, extending along the north sides of Siple Island, Getz Ice Shelf and Carney Island, from Pranke Island to Cape Gates. It was mapped by the United States Geological Survey from surveys and USN air photos, 1959–66, and named by the Advisory Committee on Antarctic Names for Admiral James S. Russell, Vice Chief of Naval Operations during the post 1957–58 IGY period.

References

External links 

 Airborne Geophysical Survey of the Amundsen Embayment
 Subglacial Topography
 Thinning ice

Seas of the Southern Ocean